Cabrera d'Anoia is a municipality in the province of Barcelona, Catalonia, Spain. Until 2007 the official name of the municipality was Cabrera d'Igualada.

The municipality includes the following settlements: Can Ros, Castell de Cabrera, Canaletes, Can Gallego, Can Feixes, Agulladolç, Can Piquer.

References

External links
 Government data pages 

Municipalities in Anoia
Populated places in Anoia